Mohammad Roshandel is an Iranian football defender who played for Sepahan in the Azadegan League.

Club career
Roshandel started his career with Etka Gorgan. Later he joined to Sepahan Academy. In Winter 2014 he promoted to first team and made his professional debut for Sepahan on November 16, 2015 against Siah Jamegan as a starter.

Club career statistics

References

External links
 Mohammad Roshandel at IranLeague.ir

1995 births
Living people
Iranian footballers
Association football defenders
Sepahan S.C. footballers